was the 5th daimyō of Kakegawa Domain in Tōtōmi Province, (modern-day Shizuoka Prefecture) in late-Edo period and Bakumatsu period Japan and a high-level office holder within the Tokugawa shogunate,  and ninth hereditary chieftain of the Kakegawa-Ōta clan. His courtesy title was Dewa-no-kami.

Biography
Ōta Sukemoto was the third son of Hotta Masazane, daimyō of Omi-Miyagawa Domain. He was selected as posthumous heir on Ōta Suketoki's sudden death in 1810 and married to one of Suketoki's daughters. At the time, he was only eleven years old. He was received in formal audience by Shōgun Tokugawa Ienari in 1812 and was appointed a sōshaban in 1818.

Sukemoto was appointed Jisha-bugyō on July 17, 1822, and Osaka jōdai on November 22, 1828, followed by the post of Kyoto Shoshidai from July 4, 1831, through May 19, 1834.

On May 6, 1837 he became a rōjū, in which position he often clashed with senior rōjū Mizuno Tadakuni over the provisions of the unpopular Tenpō Reforms, especially the Agechi-rei which was to have daimyō in the vicinity of Edo and Ōsaka surrender their holdings for equal amounts of land elsewhere, thereby consolidating Tokugawa control over these strategically vital areas. After Mizuno was deposed from office, Sukemoto promoted the interests of Tokugawa Nariaki. However, one of Nariaki's first actions was to replace Sukemoto, who was asked to retire on July 20, 1841.

On his forced retirement, Sukemoto turned Kakegawa domain over to his eldest son Ōta Sukekatsu. However upon Ienari's death, he returned to serve as rōjū again from June 23, 1858, through July 23, 1859, together with Matsudaira Noriyasu and Manabe Akikatsu. He returned again for a brief third term from April 27 – May 14, 1863.

Suekmoto later remarried to a daughter of Uesugi Narisada of Yonezawa Domain. He died on June 20, 1867 and his grave is at the Ōta clan bodaiji of Myōhokke-ji in Mishima, Shizuoka.

Notes

References 
 Appert, Georges and H. Kinoshita. (1888).  Ancien Japon. Tokyo: Imprimerie Kokubunsha.
 Jansen, Marius B. (1995).  The Emergence of Meiji Japan. Cambridge: Cambridge University Press. 
 Meyer, Eva-Maria. (1999).  Japans Kaiserhof in de Edo-Zeit: Unter besonderer Berücksichtigung der Jahre 1846 bis 1867. Münster: Tagenbuch. 
 Papinot, Edmond. (1906) Dictionnaire d'histoire et de géographie du japon. Tokyo: Librarie Sansaisha...Click link for digitized 1906 Nobiliaire du japon (2003)
 The content of much of this article was derived from that of the corresponding article on Japanese Wikipedia.

|-

|-

Fudai daimyo
Sukemoto
Rōjū
Kyoto Shoshidai
Osaka jōdai
1799 births
1867 deaths